Nak'azdli Band  is a Dakelh First Nation band with a main community located within the village of Fort St. James, British Columbia. The nation has 16 reserves totalling 1,458 hectares, and approximately 1977 members living both on - and off reserve. The Nak'azdli Band chief is Aileen Prince.

References

Further reading
 Nak'azdli t'enne Yahulduk/Nak'azdli Elders Speak, edited by Lillian Sam. (Penticton, B.C: Theytus Books ltd, 2001),

External links
Nak'azdli Band website

Dakelh governments
Omineca Country